P'isaqa (Aymara and Quechua for Nothoprocta, a bird, also spelled Pizaca) is a mountain in the Bolivian Andes which reaches a height of approximately . It is located in the Cochabamba Department, Carrasco Province, Pocona Municipality. It lies at the Wanaku Mayu.

References 

Mountains of Cochabamba Department